My Enemy may refer to:
"My Enemy" (Chvrches song), 2018
"My Enemy" (Skid Row song), 1995
"My Enemy", a 2011 song by Amorphis from The Beginning of Times
"My Enemy", a 2014 song by Hans Zimmer from The Amazing Spider-Man 2 soundtrack
"My Enemy", a 2004 song by Juliana Hatfield from In Exile Deo

See also
Enemy (disambiguation)
Enemy Mine (disambiguation)